Love at First Fight is a 2014 French romantic comedy film directed by Thomas Cailley. It was screened as part of the Directors' Fortnight section of the 2014 Cannes Film Festival, where it won the FIPRESCI Prize in the Parallel Section. In January 2015, the film received nine nominations at the 40th César Awards, winning Best Actress, Most Promising Actor and Best First Feature Film.

Cast
 Adèle Haenel as Madeleine
 Kévin Azaïs as Arnaud Labrède
 Antoine Laurent as Manu Labrède
 Brigitte Roüan as Hélène Labrède 
 William Lebghil as Xavier  
 Thibault Berducat as Victor  
 Nicolas Wanczycki as Lieutenant Schliefer 
 Steve Tientcheu as Adjudant Ruiz

Accolades

References

External links
 

2014 films
2014 romantic comedy films
2014 directorial debut films
2010s French-language films
French romantic comedy films
Louis Delluc Prize winners
Films featuring a Best Actress César Award-winning performance
Best First Feature Film César Award winners
2010s French films